Robert Anthony Gleeson (6 December 1873 – 27 September 1919) was a South African cricketer.

A useful batsman and a medium pace bowler, Robert Gleeson was born in Port Elizabeth, Cape Province, on 6 December 1873 and died in the same city on 27 September 1919, aged 45.  His first-class career spanned the years 1894 to 1904 but in truth it was interrupted by a break of six years between 1897 and 1903.  Playing for Eastern Province, he was more effective in the first half of his career, hitting up scores of, amongst others, 67 against Transvaal at Cape Town in March 1894 and 71 against Natal at Johannesburg in March 1897.  He also recorded his best bowling figures during this period, 4 wickets for 9 runs against Griqualand West at Cape Town in March 1894.  When Lord Hawke brought an England side to South Africa in 1895/96, Gleeson was selected for the 1st Test, played at St. George's Park, Port Elizabeth.  Scoring just 3 in South Africa's first innings and 1 not out in their second, as well as holding two catches, he failed to impress enough to secure a place for the other two matches in the series.  His relatively early death in 1919 went unrecorded at the time and no obituary appeared within Wisden for him.

References
  World Cricketers - A Biographical Dictionary by Christopher Martin-Jenkins published by Oxford University Press (1996)
  The Wisden Book of Test Cricket, Volume 1 (1877-1977) compiled and edited by Bill Frindall published by Headline Book Publishing (1995)
  Who's Who of Cricketers by Philip Bailey, Philip Thorn & Peter Wynne-Thomas published by Hamlyn (1993)
  www.cricketarchive.com/Archive/Players

1873 births
1919 deaths
South Africa Test cricketers
South African cricketers
Eastern Province cricketers